The 1965 Grote Prijs Jef Scherens was the third edition of the Grote Prijs Jef Scherens cycle race and was held on 8 May 1965. The race started and finished in Leuven. The race was won by Fernand Deferm.

General classification

References

1965
1965 in road cycling
1965 in Belgian sport